"A Very Special Love Song" is the title of a 1974 song by country music singer Charlie Rich. The song was written by Billy Sherrill and Norro Wilson, songwriters who had also written Rich's 1973 hit, "The Most Beautiful Girl". The song is included on Rich's 1974 album, Very Special Love Songs.

Reception
Released as the follow-up single to "The Most Beautiful Girl", "A Very Special Love Song" nearly reached the top ten on the Billboard Hot 100 chart in April 1974, peaking at #11. The song was able to top two other Billboard charts that year, as it spent three weeks atop the country music chart and two weeks at the summit on the adult contemporary chart. This was the second of four chart-toppers Rich achieved on the Billboard AC chart.

Songwriters Sherrill and Wilson won a Grammy Award for "A Very Special Love Song" in the category Best Country Song at the 1975 ceremony.

Inspiration
French composer and pianist Michel Legrand's "The Summer Knows", the theme from the 1971 film Summer of '42, served as the musical inspiration for Rich's song. He was quoted by Billboard author Tom Roland as saying: "I don't think I stole from them all [sic], but that's my favorite theme of all time. There's not a similarity, and yet, you can understand what I was thinking about and where I was coming from."

Chart performance

Cover versions
Country music singer Barbara Mandrell recorded a version of this song in 1974; hers was included on her album This Time I Almost Made It.
Another version of this song was released by Alexander Forrest in April 1976. Released on the Emerald label, cat# MD1185.
Mexican pop  singer Gualberto Castro recorded a cover version in spanish as "Mi Bella Melodia".

References

External links
"A Very Special Love Song" 7" info from discogs.com

1974 singles
Charlie Rich songs
Barbara Mandrell songs
Songs written by Billy Sherrill
Songs written by Norro Wilson
Song recordings produced by Billy Sherrill
Epic Records singles
1974 songs